Litwinowicz is  a Polish and a Belarusian surname derived from the word Litwin ("Lithuanian" or anyone from the Grand Duchy of Lithuania).

Surnames of similar etymology: Slavic: Litvin, Litvinchuk, Litvinov, Litwin, Litvak, Litovchenko; German: Litauer, Littauer.

Litwinowicz, Litvinovich, or Litvinovič may refer to:
 Aleksander Litwinowicz (1879-1948), Polish general
 Irena Litvinovič (born 1958), Polish-Lithuanian theatre director
 Ivan Litvinovich (born 2001), Belarusian trampoline gymnast
 Spirydion Litwinowicz (Spiridon Litvinovich), Greek Catholic Metropolitan of Lviv (1866-1869)

Polish-language surnames
Surnames of Belarusian origin
Surnames of Lithuanian origin